Khasraj may refer to:
 Khasraj-e Beyt-e Qashem
 Khasraj-e Khalaf
 Khasraj-e Mezban
 Khasraj-e Owdeh
 Khasraj-e Razi Mohammad